The syllabus against racism is a Vatican document written in 1938, designed to promote the condemnation of racism and Nazi ideology in Catholic educational institutions.  

In April 1938, the Sacred Congregation for seminaries and universities developed at the request of Pius XI a syllabus condemning racist theories to be sent to Catholic schools worldwide.

Notes

Anti-racism
Opposition to antisemitism
Pope Pius XI
Documents of the Congregation for Catholic Education
1938 documents
1938 in Christianity